Paramyia is a genus of freeloader flies in the family Milichiidae. There are about 18 described species in Paramyia.

Species
These 18 species belong to the genus Paramyia:

 Paramyia africana Papp, 2001
 Paramyia flagellomera Papp, 2001
 Paramyia flava Papp, 2001
 Paramyia formosana Papp, 2001
 Paramyia fumipennis Malloch, 1934
 Paramyia hungarica Papp, 1993
 Paramyia inconspicua Meijere, 1916
 Paramyia latigena Papp, 2001
 Paramyia longilingua Papp, 2001
 Paramyia minuscula Papp, 2001
 Paramyia nigra Williston, 1897
 Paramyia nitens (Loew, 1869)
 Paramyia nitida Papp, 2001
 Paramyia palpalis Papp, 2001
 Paramyia regalis Papp, 2001
 Paramyia setitarsalis Papp & Swann, 2001
 Paramyia swanni Papp, 2001
 Paramyia triangularis Papp, 2001

References

Further reading

 

Carnoidea genera
Articles created by Qbugbot
Milichiidae